In quantum field theory, a sum rule is a relation between a static quantity and an integral over a dynamical quantity. Therefore, they have a form such as:

Quantum field theory sum rules should not be confused with sum rules in quantum chromodynamics or quantum mechanics.

Properties 

Many sum rules exist. The validity of a particular sum rule can be sound if its derivation is based on solid assumptions, or on the contrary, some sum rules have been shown experimentally to be incorrect, due to unwarranted assumptions made in their derivation. The list of sum rules below illustrate this.

Sum rules are usually obtained by combining a dispersion relation with the optical theorem, using the operator product expansion or current algebra.

Quantum field theory sum rules are useful in a variety of ways. They permit to test the theory used to derive them, e.g. quantum chromodynamics, or an assumption made for the derivation, e.g. Lorentz invariance. They can be used to study a particle, e.g. how does the spins of partons make up the spin of the proton. They can also be used as a measurement method.

Although in principle,  is a static quantity, the denomination of sum rule has been extended to the case where  is a probability amplitude, e.g. the probability amplitude of Compton scattering, see the list of sum rules below.

List of QCD sum rules
(The list is not exhaustive)

Baldin sum rule. This is the unpolarized equivalent of the GDH sum rule (see below). It relates the probability that a photon absorbed by a particle results in the production of hadrons (this probability is called the photo-production cross-section) to the electric and magnetic polarizabilities of the absorbing particle.
 Polarized Bjorken sum rule. This sum rule is the prototypical QCD spin sum rule. It states that in the Bjorken scaling domain, the integral of the spin structure function of the proton minus that of the neutron is proportional to the axial charge of the nucleon. Outside of the Bjorken scaling domain, the Bjorken sum rule acquires QCD scaling corrections that are known up to the 5th order in precision. The sum rule was experimentally verified within better than a 10% precision.
Unpolarized Bjorken sum rule.
 Burkhardt–Cottingham sum rule. The sum rule was experimentally verified.
 sum rule.
 Efremov–Teryaev–Leader sum rule.
 Ellis–Jaffe sum rule. The sum rule was shown to not hold experimentally, suggesting that the strange quark spin contributes non-negligibly to the proton spin. The Ellis–Jaffe sum rule provides an example of how the violation of a sum rule teaches us about a fundamental property of matter (in this case, the origin of the proton spin).
 Forward spin polarizability sum rule.
 Fubini–Furlan–Rossetti Sum Rule.
 Gerasimov–Drell–Hearn sum rule (GDH, sometimes DHG sum rule). This is the polarized equivalent of the Baldin sum rule (see above). The derivation of the GDH sum rule assumes that the theory that governs the structure of the target particle (e.g. QCD for a nucleon or a nucleus) is causal (that is, one can use dispersion relations or equivalently for GDH, the Kramers–Kronig relations), unitary and Lorentz and gauge invariant. These three assumptions are very basic premises of Quantum Field Theory. Therefore, testing the GDH sum rule tests these fundamental premises. The GDH sum rule was experimentally verified (within a 10% precision). 
 Generalized GDH sum rule. Several generalized versions of the GDH sum rule have been proposed. It can be argued that calling this relation sum rule is improper, since  is not a static property of the target particle nor a directly measurable observable. Nonetheless, the denomination sum rule is widely used. 
 Gottfried sum rule.
 Gross–Llewellyn Smith sum rule. It states that in the Bjorken scaling domain, the integral of the  structure function of the nucleon is equal to the number of valence quarks composing the nucleon, i.e., equal to 3. Specifically: . Outside of the Bjorken scaling domain, the Gross–Llewellyn Smith sum rule acquires QCD scaling corrections that are identical to that of the Bjorken sum rule. 
 Momentum sum rule: It states that the sum of the momentum fraction  of all the partons (quarks, antiquarks and gluons inside a hadron is equal to 1.
Ji Sum rule: Relates the integral of generalized parton distributions to the angular momentum carried by the quarks or by the gluons.
Schwinger sum rule.
 Wandzura–Wilczek sum rule.

See also
Quantum chromodynamics
Proton spin crisis

References 

Quantum field theory
Quantum chromodynamics
 
Nuclear physics